"Disco Lady" is a 1976 single by American singer Johnnie Taylor that went on to become his biggest hit. It spent four weeks at No. 1 on the Billboard Hot 100 and six weeks atop the Billboard R&B chart in the U.S. It was also the first single to be certified platinum by the RIAA; ultimately it sold over 2.5 million copies. Billboard ranked it as the No. 3 song for 1976; Cash Box had it the year's No. 1 song

The single was Taylor's first for Columbia Records, where he signed after his long-time label, Stax Records, went bankrupt. The song was produced by Taylor's long-time producer, Don Davis. Among the guests on the song were four members of Parliament-Funkadelic: bassist Bootsy Collins, keyboardist Bernie Worrell, guitarist Glenn Goins, drummer Tiki Fulwood, and background vocals by BRANDYE (Cynthia Douglas, Donna Davis, Pamela Vincent).

"Disco Lady" was the first Hot 100 No. 1 hit with the word "disco" in the title, although it is not a disco song. The single also reached No. 25 on the UK Singles Chart.

It earned Taylor his second Grammy Award nomination for Best Male R&B Vocal Performance.

In 1998, a remake of the song "Disco Lady 2000" (along with a "radio slam" remix) can be heard on the album Taylored to Please released by Malaco Records.

Chart history

Weekly charts

Year-end charts

All-time charts

References

External links
 Lyrics of this song
 

Songs about disco
1976 singles
Johnnie Taylor songs
Billboard Hot 100 number-one singles
Cashbox number-one singles
Songs written by Don Davis (record producer)
1976 songs
Songs written by Harvey Scales
Columbia Records singles
Song recordings produced by Don Davis (record producer)